The National Board of Review Award for Best Original Screenplay is an annual award given (since 2003) by the National Board of Review of Motion Pictures.

Winners

2000s

2010s

2020s

Multiple winners
Charlie Kaufman - 2
Coen brothers - 2

References

National Board of Review Awards
Screenwriting awards for film
Awards established in 2003
2003 establishments in the United States